American recording artist Monica has recorded material for her eight studio albums and has collaborated with other artists for duets and featured songs on their respective albums and charity singles. She is also known to have written, recorded and filmed material that has never been officially released. Many of the singer's unreleased songs have been registered – the majority by her publishing company Mondenise Music – with professional bodies such as the United States Copyright Office, the Songwriters Hall of Fame, Broadcast Music Incorporated (BMI), American Society of Composers, Authors and Publishers (ASCAP), and EMI Music Publishing.

Many officially unreleased Monica songs have been scheduled, at one point, for release on records by the singer, including her seven studio albums Miss Thang (1995), The Boy Is Mine (1998), All Eyez on Me (2002), After the Storm (2003), The Makings of Me (2006), Still Standing (2010), New Life (2012), and Code Red (2015). For varying reasons, the tracks were ultimately rejected and, as of 2016, remain either completely unreleased or have been leaked onto the internet and seen release on mixtapes such as Monica: Made (2007) without gaining an official release. The singer's unreleased material includes songs recorded by Arnold as a solo artist and demo versions of tracks which were eventually re-recorded by other artists, some featuring established artists such as Fantasia, T-Pain, Trey Songz and Young Joc.

Released songs

Unreleased songs

See also
Monica discography
Monica videography

References

External links
Monica.com — official website.

Monica